Marvin Lazarus (born 13 June 1985) is a South African cricketer. He played in two Twenty20 matches for Border in 2013.

See also
 List of Border representative cricketers

References

External links
 

1985 births
Living people
South African cricketers
Border cricketers
Cricketers from East London, Eastern Cape